Faraon is a surname. Notable people with the surname include:

Davide Faraon (born 1985), Italian footballer 
Rodney Faraon, American intelligence officer, briefer, and speechwriter